The European Union Baroque Orchestra (EUBO) is a training initiative which allows young performers of baroque music from the European Union to gain orchestral experience as part of their career development. Its purpose is to bridge the gap between conservatoire study and a professional career. The success of the project, under the direction of the world's leading baroque musicians, can be measured in the number of ex-EUBO members who now play in Europe's leading baroque orchestras. Founded in 1985 and originally based in Oxfordshire, UK, the orchestra moved to Antwerp after Brexit.

History
EUBO was founded in 1985 as a major initiative of European Music Year to celebrate the 300th anniversaries of three great baroque musicians: Johann Sebastian Bach, Domenico Scarlatti and George Frideric Handel. Since then, more than 600 full-time members of EUBO have given over 900 performances in 54 countries worldwide.

The orchestra performs at many of Europe's leading music festivals and concert halls, including the Amsterdam Concertgebouw, St John's Smith Square in London, the festivals Bachwoche Ansbach, and specialist early music festivals in Utrecht, York, Brugge, Valletta and London. Outside Europe, as well as tours to Japan, United States and South Africa, EUBO has played in less favoured parts of the world such as Ramallah and the Gaza Strip, Botswana, and Soweto.

Structure and funding
The European Union Baroque Orchestra is an educational charity registered in England & Wales with its administrative office in Wootton, Oxfordshire.

The orchestra is completely renewed every year. Auditions take place in spring, with usually around 100 young baroque musicians applying for the 20–25 places in the ensemble. The successful applicants then come together for concert tours which take the talented young orchestra to all corners of Europe. Members of EUBO gain performing experience, working together under the inspirational leadership of Music Director Lars Ulrik Mortensen and some of the world's finest baroque musicians. Ton Koopman, Margaret Faultless, Roy Goodman, Enrico Onofri, Rachel Podger, Paul Agnew, Gottfried von der Goltz, Alfredo Bernardini, Sergio Azzolini and Amandine Beyer are amongst the artists who regularly work with EUBO.

EUBO is partnered by nine European organisations within a co-operation project ‘EUBO Mobile Baroque Academy’ with co-funding from the Creative Europe programme of the European Union. The project addresses the unequal provision across the EU of baroque music education and performance in new and creative ways. EUBO has been honoured with the status of Cultural Ambassador for the European Union in perpetuity.

Since 2008, EUBO has been Orchestra-in-Residence in Echternach, Luxembourg, working together with the City of Echternach, Festival International Echternach and the cultural centre Trifolion. EUBO's residency in Echterach and the Echter’Barock series of concerts are made possible by grants from the City of Echternach and the Ministry of Culture in Luxembourg.

Discography
1990 – Handel – Tamerlano. Roy Goodman, director
1991 – William Corbett – Bizzarie Universali. Roy Goodman, director; Andrew Manze, violin 
1991 – Pieter Hellendaal – 6 Concerti Grossi. Roy Goodman, director; Andrew Manze, violin
1992 – Birds, Beasts and Battles. Monica Huggett, conductor/violin
1996 – J. S. Bach Markus Passion. Roy Goodman, director; Ring Ensemble of Finland (Musica Oscura)
2002 – Handel – Apollo e Dafne,  The Alchemist (Naxos Records CD)
2002 – Handel, Rameau, Rebel. Roy Goodman, director
2003 – The Spirit of History (The Gift of Music CD)
2004 – Music for a Great House (The Gift of Music CD)
2005 – Rameau: Ballet Suites (Naxos CD)
2006 – Bach: Matthäus-Passion, Johannes-Passion, Markus Passion, Lukas Passion (Brilliant Classics CD)
2007 – George Frideric Handel, Johann Sterkel, John Stanley – Suites & Solos (The Gift of Music CD)
2008 – Jean-Philippe Rameau, Johann Joseph Fux, Johann Sebastian Bach – Baroque Suites. Lars Ulrik Mortensen, director (The Gift of Music CD)
2013 – George Frideric Handel – Pure Handel. Lars Ulrik Mortensen, director; Maria Keohane, soprano (ERP 6212)
2013 – Handel, Bach, Ferrandini, Torelli – Joy & Sorrow unmasked DVD. Lars Ulrik Mortensen, director (ERP 6412)
2013 – G. F. Handel – Peace & Celebration. Lars Ulrik Mortensen, director; The Choir of Clare College Cambridge (OBSIDIAN 711)
2014 – A. Vivaldi – The Four Seasons & String Concerti. Lars Ulrik Mortensen, director; Huw Daniel, violin; Bojan Cicic, violin; Johannes Pramsohler, violin; Zefira Valova, violin; Antonio De Sarlo, speaker (OBSIDIAN 713)

See also
 European Union Chamber Orchestra
 European Union Youth Orchestra
 List of youth orchestras

References

External links
EUBO website

1985 establishments in Europe
Musical groups established in 1985
European youth orchestras
Early music orchestras
Organizations related to the European Union
Music and the European Union
Music charities based in the United Kingdom
Pan-European music organizations